Dawn Marie Sass (born September 18, 1959) is an American politician who served as the 33rd State Treasurer of Wisconsin from 2007 to 2011. She was the third female Treasurer in Wisconsin's history.

Early life and education 
Born in Milwaukee, Wisconsin, Sass graduated from St. Mary's Academy. She earned a Bachelor of Arts degree in history and political science from the University of Wisconsin–Milwaukee and did graduate work at National Louis University. Sass later earned a Master of Business Administration from Keiser University.

Career 
Sass worked as a full-time Custody Placement Specialist, Juvenile Probation Officer, and Child Welfare Worker for Milwaukee County, where she was an active member and official of her union, the American Federation of State, County and Municipal Employees. She also worked as a part-time retail clerk at Boston Store (Wisconsin) and a part-time Pharmacy Technician at St. Luke's Hospital in Milwaukee.

Wisconsin Treasurer 
Sass first ran for State Treasurer against incumbent Republican Jack Voight in 1998; she lost with 754,177 votes (46.3%) to Voight's 814,380 (50.0%), with 31,452 (1.9%) for the Wisconsin Greens nominee, 28,561 (1.7%) for the Libertarian Tim Peterson, and 171 (.01%) for the Taxpayers' Party candidate.
  She was a delegate to the 2000 Democratic National Convention; and ran unsuccessfully for the Wisconsin State Senate's 33rd district in a 2001 special election to succeed Margaret Farrow, losing the race to Ted Kanavas 10,238 to 3,557. She ran once more in 2002 against Voight, losing again with 720,445 votes to Voight's 824,049 and 114,955 for Green Paul Aschenbrenner; and ran unsuccessfully in 2004 for Milwaukee County Treasurer.

In 2006, she defeated incumbent Voight on November 7, 2006, in a narrow upset victory by a margin of 8,648 votes(0.42%) with little party support. She had spent almost $4000 on the race, most of it coming from her own pocket (she was working as a store clerk at Boston Store at this time).

On November 2, 2010, Sass was defeated for reelection by Kurt W. Schuller.

During her term as State Treasurer, Sass traveled to all 72 Wisconsin counties every year of her four year term.  She credits former U.S. Senator Russ Feingold for giving her the blueprint for the county visits (she had the honor after her election to visit several counties with the Senator).  In her four years, Sass helped reunite Wisconsinites with just over $100 million dollars in unclaimed property money, stream-lined the process for claiming unclaimed funds, and staffed the State Treasurer booth at the Wisconsin State Fair helping to process claims for visitors to the booth.  Sass also started contests for school-aged children to raise awareness of the Wisconsin 529 savings plan - EdVest.  The contests included a coloring contest for 1st - 3rd graders where they drew what they wanted to be when they grew up, an essay contest for 4-6th graders where they described what they wanted to be when they grew up and a video contest for 9th and 10th graders - where they made a video to describe what they wanted to be or how they would choose their college.  The winners of the first coloring contest saw their drawings made into a poster the was distributed to public libraries throughout the state.  The winners of the first essay contest were invited to the Governor's residence, with family and teachers, to read their essay's and enjoy a reception.  The video winner's were invited to a U.W. Board of Regents meeting where they showed the winning videos and had a small reception after.  Several of the members of the Board of Regents commented it was one of the best meetings they had attended.  In all, sixty-seven students were awarded EdVest College Savings Accounts ranging from $500.00 to $1,000.00.

Other campaigns 
In February 2012, she lost to fellow Democrats Tim Carpenter and Spencer Coggs (like Sass, a former AFSCME activist) in the four-way non-partisan primary to win a place on the ballot for Milwaukee City Treasurer in the Spring 2012 election. Coggs polled 13,559 votes; Carpenter 12,880; Sass 5,089 and Socialist Rick Kissell 2,241.

In August 2014 she lost to former Assemblyman David Cullen for the Democratic nomination for Milwaukee County Treasurer; Cullen drew 38,492 votes (53%) to Sass' 33,729 (47%). (There was no candidate in any other party's primary in that race.)

In 2018, she ran in the Democratic statewide primary for Wisconsin State Treasurer, this time facing two female opponents. One of her opponents was Cynthia Kaump, a small business owner and financial professional from Madison, Wisconsin, who also had been a political and investigative reporter on television news for over two decades. However, Kaumps’ momentum as she was gaining in the polls dropped significantly when a week before the primary it was revealed by the Milwaukee Journal Sentinel that she owed money to a tax preparer business. Sass' main opponent in the primary was Eau Claire, Wisconsin native, Sarah Godlewski. Although a successful entrepreneur, Godlewski had an inside track as she was the National Finance Council co-chair of Ready PAC, the a political action committee in support of the Hillary Clinton 2016 presidential campaign. She was also the Wisconsin Women's Director for Clinton's 2016 campaign. Godlewski co-chaired, with Jack Voight, the Save Our Fiscal Watchdog Committee, a successful grassroots Get Out The Vote effort which defeated an April 2018 proposed amendment to the Wisconsin Constitution to eliminate the office of state treasurer.

Green County Supervisor 
In 2020, Sass (who had moved to Belleville, Wisconsin) announced her candidacy for Green County Supervisor. She focused her campaign on corporate farms stating: "Green County has always been a farming community. These large farms are pushing farming families out that have been in our community for generations. We all need to help each other and fight for small family farms." She faced attorney Skip Miller and in the April election and was elected with 62% of the vote.

Electoral history

Wisconsin State Treasurer (1998)

| colspan="6" style="text-align:center;background-color: #e9e9e9;"| General Election, November 3, 1998

Wisconsin Senate (2001)

| colspan="6" style="text-align:center;background-color: #e9e9e9;"| Special Election, July 10, 2001

Wisconsin State Treasurer (2002, 2006, 2010)

| colspan="6" style="text-align:center;background-color: #e9e9e9;"| General Election, November 5, 2002 
 

| colspan="6" style="text-align:center;background-color: #e9e9e9;"| General Election, November 7, 2006 
 

| colspan="6" style="text-align:center;background-color: #e9e9e9;"| General Election, November 2, 2010

Wisconsin State Treasurer (2018)

| colspan="6" style="text-align:center;background-color: #e9e9e9;"| Democratic Primary, August 14, 2018

References

External links
Follow the Money - Dawn Marie Sass 2006 campaign contributions

|-

1959 births
20th-century American women
21st-century American politicians
21st-century American women politicians
American Federation of State, County and Municipal Employees people
Candidates in the 1998 United States elections
Candidates in the 2002 United States elections
Living people
National Louis University alumni
Politicians from Milwaukee
Probation and parole officers
State treasurers of Wisconsin
University of Wisconsin–Milwaukee alumni
Wisconsin Democrats
Women in Wisconsin politics